Basket Club Maritime Gravelines-Dunkerque, commonly referred to as BCM Gravelines-Dunkerque, is a French professional basketball club based in Gravelines. They currently play in the Pro A, the highest professional league in France. The team plays it home games at Sportica, which has a capacity for 3,043 people.

History
The 2020–21 season brought severe challenges as the club struggled with the Covid breaks plus had to compensate the injuries of key players such as Erik McCree and Briante Weber. Yet, the arrival of new head coach JD Jackson brought some victories so that the team was able to stay in the country's prime division.

Honours
 French Cup
 Winners (1): 2004–05
 Semaine des As
Winners (2): 2011, 2013
 Pro B
Winners (1): 1987–88

Season by season

Players

Current roster

Notable players

Head coaches
 Eric Bartecheky
 Serge Crevecoeur

References

External links
 Official website

Basketball teams in France
Basketball teams established in 1984
Sport in Nord (French department)